Serhiy Vitaliyovych Kyslenko (born 30 June 1998) is a Ukrainian professional football forward who plays for Polissya Zhytomyr.

Career
Kyslenko is a product of several Kharkiv city sports schools including FC Helios Kharkiv, FC Olimpik Kharkiv, others. His first coach was Mykola Pilghui. He was noticed by the FC Lviv head coach at the 2016-17 Ukrainian First League under-19 final tournament that took place in Zakarpattia Oblast when Kyslenko played for UFC Olimpik Kharkiv and was among the tournament's top scorers.

In 2016 Kyslenko started to play for the FC Helios Kharkiv reserves in the regional competitions of Kharkiv Oblast, later joined FC Olimpik Kharkiv that fielded its team in youth competitions conducted jointly with the Professional Football League of Ukraine.

He made his professional debut for FC Lviv in the match against FC Bukovyna Chernivtsi on 15 July 2017 in the Ukrainian Second League scoring a hat-trick in 4-3 win. In 2017 Kyslenko became one of the competition's leading scorers of the 2017-18 Ukrainian Cup.

References

External links
 

Serhiy Kyslenko: to Metalist for demonstration they did not call (Сергій Кисленко: «В Металіст на оглядини не покликали»). Gold Talánt. 3 August 2017

1998 births
Living people
Ukrainian footballers
Association football forwards
FC Lviv players
FC Kalush players
FC Nyva Ternopil players
FC Polissya Zhytomyr players
Ukrainian Cup top scorers
Ukrainian Premier League players
Ukrainian First League players
Ukrainian Second League players
Sportspeople from Kharkiv Oblast